ChipWits is a 1984 robot simulation game for the Apple Macintosh, written by Doug Sharp and Mike Johnston, and published by BrainPower software. It was ported to the Apple II and Commodore 64.

Summary

The player uses an iconic programming language to teach a virtual robot how to navigate various mazes of varying difficulty. The gameplay straddled the line between entertainment and programming education.  The game was developed in MacFORTH, and later ported to the Apple II and Commodore 64.

Reception
Computer Gaming World preferred Robot Odyssey to ChipWits but stated that both were "incredibly vivid simulation experiences". The magazine criticized ChipWits inability to save more than 16 robots or copy a robot to a new save slot, and cautioned that it "may be too simple for people familiar with programming". The magazine added that the criticism was "more a cry for a more complex Chipwits II game than condemnation of the current product".

ChipWits won numerous awards, including MACazine Best of '85 and MacUser's Editor's Choice 1985 Award, as well as being named The 8th Best Apple Game of All Time by Maclife.

New Versions
From 2006 to 2008, Mike Johnston and Doug Sharp developed and released ChipWits II, written in Adobe AIR. That version featured several innovations including an in-game tutorial, updated graphics, a soundtrack, isometric and 3D rendering, several new chips, and new missions.

In September 2021, ChipWits, Inc. was formed by Doug Sharp and Mark Roth to create a modern reboot of the game. The new version is being written in Unity and is in early access testing. More information can be found on the game's official website, where players can help guide the direction of the game's development.

References

External links
 Official Website
 ChipWits II Official Website (archive)

1984 video games
Apple II games
Commodore 64 games
Classic Mac OS games
Programming games
Video games developed in the United States